is a 1986 Japanese film directed by Keisuke Kinoshita, revisiting his melancholic earlier work, Times of Joy and Sorrow (1957), of a lighthouse keeper and the transient lifestyle he and his family endure. Shot at 10 different lighthouses, four temples, and various scenic locations (including two of the famous Three Views of Japan (日本三景)), spanning the length of Japan from Kyushu to Hokkaido, the film serves a secondary purpose as an insightful time capsule travelogue of early 1980s Japan.

Plot 
Fujita, a lighthouse keeper of the Maritime Safety Agency, prepares to transfer to another lighthouse as his father and a young protege drop in to see him off, identifying what will be a story told over the course of a decade from the perspectives of 3 generations of a family, and their evolving relationships with each other. The film follows the family through their trials and tribulations as Fujita transfers to different lighthouses during the course of his career, the children grow up and leave the family to go to school and start their own families, the father rejoins the family as his health fails and is unable to care for himself, and they learn the value of family and each day spent together.

Production 
Kinoshita based the script to his earlier film, Times of Joy and Sorrow, on an article written by Tanaka Kiyo, the wife of a lighthouse keeper at the Shioyazaki lighthouse in Fukushima. The plot of Times of Joy and Sorrow encompasses the militarization of Japan during World War 2, and involves a sense of futility as the lighthouse is darkened during the war and bombs explode outside the family home. These themes are absent in Big Joys, Small Sorrow, which speaks to the increased optimism and prosperity of Japan in the 1980s, as well as the frustration felt by Fujita's wife Asako, who is more able to express her thoughts regarding her life as the wife of a lighthouse keeper rather than dutifully accepting her fate in Times of Joy and Sorrow.

The film received support from the then Maritime Safety Agency, since renamed the Japan Coast Guard, and serves as a tribute to the agency with unprecedented access not only to the lighthouses, but a Bell 212 helicopter, the Kure Maritime Safety University, aboard ships such as the Zao (PLH-05) and Teshio (PM-03 & PM-09) class patrol vessels, the Kojima (PL-21) training vessel during a fleet review, as well as a generous plug for All Nippon Airways, creating a "gorgeous travelogue," said Los Angeles Times film critic Kevin Thomas, of the "unspoiled beauty spots on Japan’s coastlines".

Cast 

 Gō Katō as Yoshiaki Fujita (Sugimoto)
 Reiko Ohara as Asako Fujita (Sugimoto)
 Hitoshi Ueki as Kunio Sugimoto
 Kiichi Nakai as Keijiro Daimon 
 Misako Konno as Yukiko Nagao
 Ken Tanaka as Takeshi Nagao 
 Yoko Shinoyama as Masako Fujita (Daimon) 
 Hayao Okamoto as Eisuke Fujita (Sugimoto)

Featured locations

Lighthouses 
 Kyogamisaki Lighthouse, Tango, Kyoto Prefecture
 Irōzaki Lighthouse, Izu, Shizuoka Prefecture
 Hesaki Lighthouse, Kitakyushu, Fukuoka Prefecture
 Himeshima Lighthouse(ja), Himeshima, Ōita Prefecture
 Mizunokojima Lighthouse, Bungo Channel
 Hachijojima Lighthouse(ja), Hachijō-jima Island, Izu Islands
 Shiriyazaki Lighthouse, Shimokita, Aomori Prefecture
 Port of Hakodate(ja), Hakodate, Hokkaido
 Esan Misaki Lighthouse(ja), Hakodate, Hokkaido
 Yagoshima Misaki Lighthouse(ja), Shiriuchi, Hokkaido

Other points of interest 
 Nishi-Maizuru Station, Maizuru, Kyoto Prefecture
 Nariai-ji Buddhist Temple (ja), Miyazu, Kyoto Prefecture
 Amanohashidate, Tango-Amanohashidate-Ōeyama Quasi-National Park, Kyoto Prefecture - one of the Three Views of Japan
 Matsuno-dera Buddhist Temple (ja), Maizuru, Kyoto Prefecture
 Myōtsū-ji Buddhist Temple, Obama, Fukui Prefecture
 St John's Anglican Church (ja), Hakodate, Hokkaido
 Hiroshima Peace Memorial, Hiroshima
 Kure Maritime Safety University, Kure, Hiroshima Prefecture
 Itsukushima Shinto Shrine, Miyajima, Hiroshima Prefecture - one of the Three Views of Japan
 Fukue-jima Island, Gotō Islands, Nagasaki Prefecture

Reception

Release 
Screened in competition at the Locarno Film Festival, Big Joys, Small Sorrows was theatrically released internationally in 1986 by Shochiku, earning a modest ¥395 million. VHS and Laserdisc editions are now scarce, however region 2 DVDs are still available in Japan from Shochiku Home Entertainment.

The Criterion Channel included Big Joys, Small Sorrows among the inaugural films available for streaming upon its launch in Spring 2019.

References

External links 
 

1986 films
1980s road movies
Shochiku films
Films directed by Keisuke Kinoshita
Films with screenplays by Keisuke Kinoshita
Films shot in Japan
Films set in Hiroshima
Films set in Hokkaido
Films set in Nagasaki
Films set in the 1980s
Films shot in Kure
Films about families
Films about military personnel
Films about travel
Japanese road movies
Seafaring films
Works set in lighthouses
Maritime culture
1980s Japanese films